Masemola is a Northern Sotho surname. People with this surname include:

Manche Masemola (1913–1928), South African Christian martyr
Jafta Masemola (1929–1990), South African anti-apartheid activist
Richard Masemola, South African Anglican priest

See also
Ga Masemola, village in Limpopo Province, South Africa

Bantu-language surnames